John le Espicer was one of two Member of Parliament for the constituency of York along with Nicholas Clareveaux in the first Parliament of 1297.

Life and politics

Le Espicer had served as a Bailiff of the city of York in 1278 and as the nineteenth Mayor in 1291. His son, John, would become the thirtieth Mayor between 1301 and 1304.
A prominent member of the city, he was appointed the King's Merchant Seal on 15 February 1288, an office of the Crown in many cities at that time.
He was elected to Parliament on 25 May 1297.

References

Politicians from York
Members of the Parliament of England for constituencies in Yorkshire
English MPs 1297
13th-century births